The discography of American rapper and songwriter Earl Sweatshirt consists of four studio albums, two mixtapes, two extended plays, and 20 singles (including seven as a featured artist).

Earl Sweatshirt released his first mixtape Kitchen Cutlery under the name of Sly Tendencies in 2008. He then joined Odd Future and released the mixtape Earl in 2010. In 2012 he came back as a rapper and was featured on Odd Future's single "Oldie". He released the first single from his debut album in 2012 and later he released the singles "Whoa" featuring Tyler the Creator and  "Hive" featuring Vince Staples and Casey Veggies. Doris was released in August 2013 and debuted at number 5 on the albums chart with first week sales of 60,000. The album also debuted at number one on the Top Rap Albums chart. In 2015 Earl released his second studio album I Don't Like Shit, I Don't Go Outside, which was met with critical acclaim. The album sold 40,000 copies in its first week debuting at number 12. His latest album, Sick!, was released on January 14, 2022.

Albums

Studio albums

Mixtapes

Extended plays

Singles

As lead artist

As featured artist

Other charted songs

Guest appearances

Music videos

Notes

See also
 Earl Sweatshirt production discography

References

External links
 
 
 
 

Discographies of American artists
Hip hop discographies
 
 
Earl Sweatshirt